Sho Watanabe is a Japanese wheelchair racer, who won the 2017 Tokyo Marathon, came second at the 2020 Tokyo Marathon, and came third at the 2017 New York City Marathon.

Personal life
Watanabe is from Fukuoka, Japan.

Career
Watanabe came second in the 10,000 metres T54 race at the 2013 IPC Athletics World Championships. Watanabe won the 2017 Tokyo Marathon, beating race favourite Marcel Hug. In the same year, Watanabe finished third at the 2017 New York City Marathon. At the 2017 World Para Athletics Championships in London, Watanabe, Tomoki Suzuki, Yuki Nishi, and Hitoshi Matsunaga won the 4 × 400 metres relay T53/T54 race, by virtue of being the only finishers.

He finished second at the 2019 Singapore Marathon behind countryman Kota Hokonuie. Watanabe came second at the 2020 Tokyo Marathon behind fellow Japanese competitor Tomoki Suzuki. At the 2020 London Marathon, Watanabe was involved in a six-person sprint finish for the victory, and finished fourth. Watanabe finished in 1:36:08, exactly the same time as Marcel Hug who finished third. The next year, he finished seventh at the London Marathon, and ninth at the Boston and New York City Marathons.

References

Year of birth missing (living people)
Japanese marathon runners
Tokyo Marathon male winners
Sportspeople from Fukuoka (city)
Living people
21st-century Japanese people